Miguel Ángel Castillo Didier (born 14 April 1934) is a Chilean hellenist, translator, scholar and musicologist.

Castillo Didier has been recognized as one of the most prestigious translators of the poets Constantine P. Cavafy, Giorgos Seferis and Nikos Kazantzakis, so his work is also recognized and awarded by the Greek government itself.

Biography
He was born in Santiago.

During Augusto Pinochet's regime, he was exiled in Venezuela.

On 27 March 2012, the State of Chile, on National Council for Culture and the Arts behalf, awarded Castillo the Pablo Neruda Order of Artistic and Cultural Merit in National Library of Chile dependencies.

Publications
Grecia y Francisco de Miranda. Precursor, héroe y martir de las Independencia Hispanoamericana. Santiago: University of Chile, 1995.

See also
 Fotios Malleros
 Héctor Herrera Cajas
 Universidad de Chile Center for Byzantine and Neohellenic Studies

References

1934 births
Living people
Chilean historians
Chilean Byzantinists
University of Chile alumni
Academic staff of the University of Chile